Ivano Balić (born 1 April 1979) is a Croatian former professional handballer who is currently working as assistant coach of the Croatia national handball team. He was voted five times in a row as the most valuable player in major international competitions, and is one of only four male handball players who received the IHF World Player of the Year award on two occasions (2003, 2006). He was voted the best handball player in history in an online poll organized by the International Handball Federation (IHF).

Balić was a 2003 World and 2004 Olympic champion with Croatia.

Early life 
Born in Split, Ivano was the only child of handball players, mother Stjepanka and father Žarko Balić. After the first three months of his birth, Balić moved with his parents to Italy because of his father's professional career. During his time in Italy Balić lived in Rovereto and Prato. At age of seven Balić and his mother returned to Split. When his father came back playing for RK Split in the Yugoslav Second League, Balić would always love to watch his father's play.

Balić started playing basketball with KK Split due to him being a big fan of the club, which at the time was three time European champion. He played basketball until 1995 when his father's friend and coach at RK Split, Mate Bokan, at the time suggested he should play handball.

Club career 
Balić began his senior handball career with RK Brodomerkur Split which competed in the top-tier Croatian First A League. In his first season Brodomerkur finished second in the league and got to the semi-finals of the EHF Cup where they lost to THW Kiel which won the Cup. He played for Brodomerkur for three more seasons reaching top positions in the league and reaching the quarter-finals of the EHF Cup.

In 2001 Balić moved to RK Metković Jambo. His first season started out with winning the Croatian Cup and league championship. Even though Metković won the league, their title was stripped away administratively and given to Badel 1862 Zagreb. This season was also his first season playing the EHF Champions League. The next few seasons Balić spent perfecting his game which was mostly seen in 2003 when he became the first Croatian handballer to win the IHF World Player of the Year award and was voted Croatian Handballer of the Year in 2004.

Balić moved to Portland San Antonio in 2004. He chose San Antonio so he could play with his idol Jackson Richardson. During his first season, he helped the club win the league championship and reached the quarter-final of the Champions League. The next season saw Balić in his first and only Champions League final. Unfortunately, San Antonio lost to a very strong BM Ciudad Real in both final matches (losing 19–25 in the first and 28–37 in the second leg). Although he did not win the Champions League, he got his second IHF World Player of the Year award in 2006. In 2007 Balić was voted best Croatian athlete by Sportske novosti.

Between 2008 and 2012, Balić played for Croatian powerhouse RK CO Zagreb, winning the Croatian Premier League and Croatian Cup four times. 

In 2012 Balić returned to Spain to play for Atlético Madrid. He stayed for only a season because the club went through bankruptcy. At the club he had a fantastic season winning the IHF Super Globe and Copa del Rey while finishing second in the league championship.

In 2013 Balić signed with German team HSG Wetzlar. After two seasons spending there, Balić announced his retirement from professional handball at the beginning of the 2014–15 season. On 5 June, Balić played his last professional handball game in a 29–24 win against Göppingen, in which he scored one goal and made five assists.

International career 
In 1998 Balić started playing for Croatia under-20 and under-21 national teams at the same time. Next year he was called up to play for the senior Croatia men's national team, but he got pneumonia. He came to training and the physiotherapist noticed that he was sick so they gave him some antibiotics and sent him home. 

In December 2000 Balić was called up to train for the 2001 World Championship. In training, Balić got injured by trying to catch a reflected ball to which Petar Metličić fell on his foot and ruptured his ligaments. Because of this injury, Balić had to rest for twenty days and missed the World Championship in France.

Balić finally made his debut for the senior national team at the 2001 Mediterranean Games in Tunisia where Croatia won first place. Next year Balić played at the 2002 European Championship in Sweden where Croatia finished in last place. Although they finished last in the tournament, they shocked the world a year later at the 2003 World Championship in Portugal where they won first place; after losing their opening match against Argentina (29–30), they beat Saudi Arabia, Russia, France, Hungary, Egypt, Denmark, Spain, and lastly Germany in the final.

In January 2004 Balić was called up to play at the 2004 European Championship in Slovenia. Croatia had a good start in the group stage beating Spain and Denmark, and conceding a draw against Portugal. Croatia came all the way to the semi-finals where they lost against hosts Slovenia and finished fourth losing to Denmark in a third place game. Balić was included in the all-star team and was voted the best player and the best play maker at the tournament. In August of the same year Balić was selected to play at the 2004 Summer Olympics where the national team won first place. Croatia went undefeated through the tournament and Balić was selected in the all-star team and was the best play maker at the tournament. For winning the gold medal, all players were awarded the Franjo Bučar State Award for Sport yearly award. Balić won the award with the team, as he also won another yearly award by himself.

At the 2005 World Championship in Tunisia, Croatia came in second place losing to Spain in the final game. Balić was voted MVP of the tournament and the best play maker. At the 2006 European Championship in Switzerland, Croatia came in fourth. Balić was once again voted MVP of the tournament and the best play maker, also being the fourth top goalscorer with 43 goals and top field goalscorer. The same year Balić was also part of the team that won the Stratoil World Cup in Sweden and Germany. During this tournament Balić invented the nickname of the Croatian national team: Kauboji.

At the 2007 World Championship in Germany, Croatia came in fifth place, with Balić was voted MVP once again. Balić also played during the 2008 European Championship in Norway where Croatia suffered a defeat from Denmark in the final. That silver medal was the first European championship medal Balić had won. Balić was also voted best centre back and was joint top goalscorer alongside Nikola Karabatić and Lars Christiansen with 44 goals.

In the 2008 European Championship, he was the equal top scorer with 44 goals as he led Croatia to a silver medal and was also voted to the all-star team of the tournament. The same year Balić was selected to be Croatia's flagbearer at the 2008 Summer Olympics in Beijing. Unfortunately, the tournament did not go so well. Croatia finished in fourth place losing the third place for the bronze medal to Spain in an awful defeat of 29–35. Balić did not play his best at the tournament failing to receive an award. The next national team challenge Balić faced was the 2009 World Championship in Croatia. Even though Croatia went undefeated throughout the tournament, France beat them in a painful final match, during which a rivalry emerged between Balić and Nikola Karabatić, which the media named "clash of the titans". At the 2010 European Championship in Austria, Croatia won another silver medal losing to France in the final game.

Following unsuccessful 2011 World Championship, where Croatia came in fifth place, in 2012 Balić won two bronze medals with Croatia–at the European Championship in Serbia and at the Olympics in London. Prior to the 2013 World Championship in Spain, Balić was dropped from the national team by then head coach Slavko Goluža, thus he retired from the national team. After the match, there was a special ceremony dedicated to Balić. During the ceremony, Jackson Richardson, his handball idol, came to congratulate him on his career.

Post-playing career 
Following his retirement from playing professional handball, Balić joined the Croatia men's national handball team coaching staff under newly appointed head coach Željko Babić as team's coordinator, alongside his old colleagues Petar Metličić as assistant and Valter Matošević as goalkeeper coach. As part of that staff he won the bronze medal at the 2016 European Championship in Poland with the rest of the team, and was also part of the fifth-place placement at the 2016 Summer Olympics in Rio de Janeiro.

On 8 April 2021, the Croatian Handball Federation appointed Balić as assistant coach to Hrvoje Horvat in the coaching staff of the senior Croatian national handball team.

Personal life 
From 1999 to 2006 Balić was married to his wife Ivana. They have together one son, Dino, born 2000. In 2014 Balić got his second child, first with girlfriend Mirela Delić, a son named Vigo. In 2016 Balić became a father for the third time. 

Balić enjoys watching basketball.

Honours

Club 
Split
Croatian First A League
Runner-up (1): 1997–98

Metković
Croatian First League
Runner-up (3): 2001–02, 2002–03, 2003–04
Croatian Cup
Winner (1): 2002
Finalist (1): 2004

San Antonio
Liga ASOBAL 
Winner (1): 2004–05
Supercopa ASOBAL
Winner (1): 2004
EHF Champions League
Finalist (1):  2005–06

Zagreb
Dukat Premier League
Winner (4): 2008–09, 2009–10, 2010–11, 2011–12
Croatian Cup
Winner (4): 2009, 2010, 2011, 2012

Atletico Madrid
Liga ASOBAL 
Runner-up (1): 2012–13
Copa del Rey
Winner (1): 2013
IHF Super Globe
Winner (1): 2012

Individual 
General
IHF World Player of the Year: 2003, 2006
Franjo Bučar State Award for Sport: 2004 (two awards)
Best Croatian handballer: 2004, 2006, 2007, 2008
Croatian Sportsman of the Year: 2007
Star on Croatian walk of fame in Opatija: 2007
Best Male Handball Player Ever – fans poll: 2010
Trophy COC for inspiring youth: 2010 
2007 most successful athlete by: Croatian Olympic Committee 
5th top goalscorer of the Croatia men's national handball team

All-star team
MVP and best centre back at the 2004 European Championship
Best centre back at the 2004 Summer Olympics
MVP and best centre back at the 2005 World Championship
MVP and best centre back at the 2006 European Championship
Top field goalscorer of the 2006 European Championship – 43 goals
MVP at the 2007 World Championship
Best centre back and top goalscorer at the 2008 European Championship – 44 goals
Best centre back of Liga ASOBAL: 2004–05, 2005–06, 2006–07

Distinctions
Best sportsperson of Dalmatia by Slobodna Dalmacija: 2003
The award of Metković "Crane" for great achievements in handball and for promoting the reputation of Metković in the country and the world: 2004

Orders 
 Order of Danica Hrvatska with face of Franjo Bučar

See also 
 2008 Summer Olympics national flag bearers

References

External links 
 
 
 
 

1979 births
Living people
Sportspeople from Split, Croatia
Croatian male handball players
Olympic handball players of Croatia
Olympic gold medalists for Croatia
Olympic bronze medalists for Croatia
Olympic medalists in handball
Handball players at the 2004 Summer Olympics
Handball players at the 2008 Summer Olympics
Handball players at the 2012 Summer Olympics
Medalists at the 2012 Summer Olympics
Medalists at the 2004 Summer Olympics
Mediterranean Games gold medalists for Croatia
Mediterranean Games medalists in handball
Competitors at the 2001 Mediterranean Games
Liga ASOBAL players
Franjo Bučar Award winners
SDC San Antonio players
RK Zagreb players
HSG Wetzlar players